Journey's End is a 1928 play by R. C. Sherriff.

Journey's End may also refer to:

Adaptations of the play
 Journey's End: A Novel, a 1930 novel by R. C. Sherriff and Vernon Bartlett
 Journey's End (1930 film), a British-American film adaptation
 Journey's End, a 1988 television adaptation; see 
 Journey's End (2017 film), a British film adaptation

Other films
 The Journey's End (film), a 1921 silent film
 Journey's End (2010 film), a Canadian documentary film

Music
 Journey's End (album), a 1982 album by jazz bassist Miroslav Vitous
 A Journey's End, a 1998 album by Primordial
 "The Journey's End", a 1972 song by Strawbs

Television
 "Journey's End" (Doctor Who), an episode of Doctor Who
 "Journey's End" (Star Trek: The Next Generation), an episode of Star Trek: The Next Generation
 "Journey's End", a three-episode season finale in Power Rangers Lost Galaxy
 "Journey's End", the final episode of Fullmetal Alchemist: Brotherhood

Other uses
 Journey's End (Boca Grande, Florida), an historic site
 Journey's End Corporation, a Canadian budget-hotel chain operator taken over by Westmont Hospitality Group in 1999
 Journey's End, an update to the video game Terraria

See also 
 The Other Side (1931 film), a German adaptation of Journey's End
 Aces High (1976 film), an English film based on Journey's End
 Twelfth Night, a play by Shakespeare, in which the song "O Mistress Mine" includes the words "journeys end" (Act II Scene 3)